Instituto para la Conservación de la Naturaleza (Nature Conservation Institute), better known by its acronym ICONA (1971–1995) was the administrative entity that was established in Spain in order to preserve and research the natural environment in the Spanish territory.

Founded four years before General Franco's death, ICONA played an ambiguous role regarding its ability to take care of the natural protected areas. Certain policies implemented by ICONA in the 1970s contributed to the depopulation of remote rural areas in different points of Spain, like for example in Acrijos, Soria and the Solana Valley in Aragon.

History
Among the government departments that were founded in Spain for similar purposes, the following deserve mention:
1833, establishment of the Dirección General de Montes'
1855, foundation of the Junta Consultiva de Montes, which later saw its name changed to Consejo Forestal, and then Consejo Superior de Montes, until it disappeared in 1967 after merging with the Consejo Superior Agrario1928, the name of the Dirección General de Montes is changed to Dirección General de Montes, Caza y Pesca Fluvial during General Primo de Rivera's dictatorship; from then onwards it would depend from the Ministerio de Fomento.
1931, on top of the existing organizations, the Instituto Forestal de Investigación is founded during the Second Spanish Republic
1971, the Dirección General de Montes is replaced by ICONA
1991, ICONA is dismantled and merged into the Instituto Nacional de Investigación y Tecnología Agraria y Alimentaria1996, foundation of the Ministerio del Medio Ambiente (Natural Environment Ministry) and the Dirección General de Conservación de la Naturaleza within it. The latter had two branches, the Subdirección de Conservación de la Biodiversidad and the ''''Subdirección de Política Forestal which presently have become the Subdirección de Montes.

References 

Felipe Crecente-Campo, Alberto Rojo Alboreca & Ulises Diéguez-Aranda, A merchantable volume system for Pinus sylvestris L. in the major mountain ranges of Spain. Departamento de Ingeniería Agroforestal, Universidad de Santiago de Compostela
Eria revista cuatrimestral de geografia, Departamento de Geografía, Universidad de Oviedo

External links

Socio-economics of nature protection policies
Insights into Rural Conservation Issues in the EEC

Disambiguation
L' Icona Ferragamo - 35th Anniversary Campaign in Celebration of Iconic Shoes by Salvatore Ferragamo

Government of Spain
Environment of Spain